The Yelling (formerly Maryandi) were a punk rock band from Los Angeles, California, United States, formed in the spring of 2008 by former Revis members Nathaniel Cox and Robert Davis.

History
Cox and Davis formed the Yelling because they wanted to pursue a new musical direction than they had with Revis, and Davis has said that they went "back to their roots" with the Yelling's establishment. Their musical style has been described as "a polyembryonal gametophyte mutation of Jack White, David Bowie, Angus Young, Cedric Bixler and Ozzy," and as "a spell-bound vortex of piercing rhythms and serrated amp swells." Many other sources have also stated that their music sounds much like that of the '70s, with one reviewer comparing their sound to "Led Zeppelin crash[ing] a Who recording session being produced by Iron Butterfly." They released an EP entitled EP on October 7, 2008, which contained five songs. The last song on the EP, "Blood on the Steps", was featured on Grand Theft Auto IV soundtrack, and on a compilation album issued by Tankfarm Records entitled "Future Sounds 32", released a day after their EP. Billboard wrote that with regard to this song, its "...the thick, fuzzy chords; warbly bass slides; and get-this-party-started intent" "put the bombastic stoner jam in White Stripes territory." Muzikreviews wrote that on their EP, the Yelling "...take their messy, machine-gun sound and blow it up inside listeners’ ears, content to mash an old-school rockabilly format with a fresher razoresque distortion," and compared the EP's sound to that of the early Smashing Pumpkins. The reviewer, Kevin Leidel, awarded the EP a rating of four and a half (out of five) stars. It was widely reported that they were planning on releasing a full length album, entitled "Long Time My Love" (also the second track on their EP), either in April or in the fall of 2009, but while a single, "21st Century Freak," was released, the album never was as the band broke up shortly before its scheduled release date.

Discography
EP (self-released EP, 2008)

References

Musical groups from Los Angeles
Musical groups established in 2008
American noise rock music groups
Musical groups disestablished in 2009
Punk rock groups from California
21st-century American musicians